The Garden City University College is one of the private universities in Ghana. It is located at Kumasi in the Ashanti Region. It was established in 2001. as the College of Information Technology and Management Systems. The college was converted into the Garden City University College in 2004. It has been granted accreditation by the National Accreditation Board.

Organization
The university has three faculties at present. The current faculties are:

GCUC Business School
The programmes run in this faculty are:
BSc Accounting with Computing
BSc Economics and Statistics
BSc Economics 
Bachelor of Business Administration:
Bachelor of Human Resource Management
BBA in Marketing
BBA in Accounting
BBA in Management
BBA in Banking and Finance

Faculty of Applied Sciences
There are five courses offered in this faculty.
BSc Computer Science
BSc. Information Technology
BSc. Mathematics And Statistics
BSc. Environmental Science
Diploma in Computer Science (Network Management and Security)

Faculty of Health Sciences 

BSc Nursing
BSc. Midwifery
BSc Physician Assistantship Studies
BSc. Medical Laboratory Technology
BSc. Dental Therapy
Diploma Nursing

Department of Diploma Studies 

Banking Technology and Accounting
Computerised Accounting
Business Administration
Medical Laboratory Technology
Librarianship Studies

Planned Schools
The university plans to add two more schools. They are:

School of Engineering and Applied Sciences – degree programs in chemistry, physics, and biological systems
Faculty of Electrical and Computer Engineering for courses in electrical, computer, systems and software engineering

Affiliations
Kwame Nkrumah University of Science and Technology
Nursing and Midwifery Council Ghana

See also
List of universities in Ghana

Notes

External links
National Accreditation Board

Universities in Ghana
Educational institutions established in 2001
2001 establishments in Ghana